The Labrador Fiasco is a book by Canadian author Margaret Atwood. It was published in 1996, and  incorporates two of Atwood's longstanding interests of Canadian history and the Canadian wilderness. Labrador refers to the Canadian place rather than the breed of dog, the Canadian Forces helicopter, the Singapore Nature Reserve, the ocean current, the Canadian Coast Guard ship, the Costa Rican district, the Filipino town, or the American politician. 

The story contains two stories, one within another. This poses some reading challenges as a constantly swapping point of view can sometimes be hard to follow.

The story also fails to reveal the names of the narrator or other main characters, thus making them mysterious to readers.

1996 short story collections
Short story collections by Margaret Atwood
Novels set in Newfoundland and Labrador
Bloomsbury Publishing books